Sitzendorf an der Schmida is a town in the district of Hollabrunn in Lower Austria, Austria.

Geography
Sitzendorf an der Schmida lies on the Schmida River. About 6.59 percent of the municipality is forested.

References

Cities and towns in Hollabrunn District